Hugh M. Neilson (born c. 1904) was the skip on the Avondale Heather CC (from Strathaven, Scotland) during the World Curling Championships known as the 1960 Scotch Cup, where Scottish team won silver medal. The team won The Rink Championship in 1960.

He also won bronze medal on 2022 Scottish Senior Curling Championships as skip.

References 

People from Strathaven
Scottish male curlers
Sportspeople from South Lanarkshire
1900s births
Year of birth uncertain
Year of death missing